Nazar Mykolayovych Kmit (born 11 September 1993) is a Ukrainian retired footballer.

Career

While attending the EduKick academy in Spain, Kmit trialed with English side Preston North End. 

In 2012, he signed for Skala Stryi in the Ukrainian third division, where his father Mykola Kmit was president. After making 103 appearances for the club, Kmit sustained an injury, with the doctors advising him to take a 1-year break from football. During that time, he decided to retire due to starting a dairy farm.

References

External links
 
 

Living people
1993 births
Ukrainian footballers
Association football midfielders
FC Skala Stryi (2004) players
Ukrainian First League players
Ukrainian Second League players